Shark Week is an annual, week long TV programming block at the Discovery Channel, which features shark-based programming. Shark Week originally premiered on July 17, 1988. Featured annually, in July or early August, it was originally devoted to conservation efforts and correcting misconceptions about sharks. Over time, it grew in popularity and became a hit on the Discovery Channel. Since 2010, it has been the longest-running cable television programming event in history. Broadcast in over 72 countries,  Shark Week is promoted heavily via social networks like Facebook and Twitter. Episodes are also available for purchase on services like Google Play Movies & TV/YouTube, Amazon Video, and iTunes. Some episodes are free on subscription-based Hulu and Discovery+.

History
The first Shark Week premiered in July 1988, with the first show to air being Caged in Fear. A total of 10 episodes aired. Other shows included Sharks: Predators or Prey, The Shark Takes a Siesta, and Sharks of a Different Color. Due to the success of the programming block, Discovery decided to continue it.

In 2000, Discovery Channel aired Shark Week Uncaged presented by famous zoologist Nigel Marven as a host. Six million 3D Pulfrich glasses were distributed to viewers in the United States and Canada for an episode featuring an extinct giant shark, which had 3D segments.

The programming has been hosted by notable personalities from other Discovery series. In 2005, Adam Savage and Jamie Hyneman of MythBusters hosted Shark Week, which premiered with a two-hour MythBusters "Jaws Special". In 2006, Mike Rowe of Dirty Jobs hosted Shark Week, and two Dirty Jobs episodes were produced to tie-into the programming, titled "Jobs that Bite" and "Jobs that Bite...Harder". That year, a 446-foot-long (136 metres) inflatable great white shark named Chompie was hung from the Discovery Channel's Silver Spring, Maryland headquarters.

In 2007, Discovery Channel celebrated Shark Week's 20th Anniversary hosted by Les Stroud, host of Survivorman. The 20th anniversary included the launch of Sharkrunners, a video game that uses GPS data from tagged sharks in the Pacific Ocean. The program Ocean of Fear aired on July 29.

In 2014, Deep Blue, a large great white shark estimated to be twenty feet long was featured in an episode of Shark Week, she was seen traversing the waters off the coast of Guadalupe Island.

In 2021, the events began streaming on Discovery+ alongside its broadcasts on the Discovery Channel.

Shweekend
In early 2015, Discovery announced a new, shark-themed weekend that would air on the Discovery Channel. The weekend took place in late August 2015, and contained three different programs. The first program, which aired on Saturday, August 29, was MythBusters vs. Jaws, followed right after by Shark Alley: Legend of Dynamite. The next day, Sunday, August 30, one program aired, called Air Jaws: Walking with Great Whites. The purpose of Shweekend was to increase the shark-related content from previous years and to prolong the summer's shark coverage.

Criticism
Since its early days, Shark Week evolved into more entertainment-oriented and sometimes fictional programming. By the 2010s, it attracted much criticism for airing dramatic programs to increase viewers and popularity. This fictitious programming, known as docufiction, has been produced in the last few years. Examples of such programs include Megalodon: The Monster Shark Lives, Shark of Darkness: Wrath of Submarine, Monster Hammerhead, Lair of the Mega Shark, and Megalodon: The New Evidence. This strategy was successful, especially for the program Megalodon: The Monster Shark Lives, as it became one of the most watched programs in Shark Week history, primarily for the controversy and backlash it generated. The mockumentary was based on an ancient giant shark called megalodon, which is now long extinct. The airing of this program fueled criticism by the professionals in the science blogger community, as well as science-advocacy bloggers like actor Wil Wheaton, and resulted in a boycott of the network. Since then, Discovery has increasingly been accused of using junk science, pushing dubious theories, creating fake stories, and misleading scientists as to the nature of the documentaries being produced. In early 2015, Discovery President Rich Ross vowed to remove this type of programming from future Shark Week lineups.

More criticism was leveled at Discovery in 2017 when the network heavily promoted a race between Olympic gold medal winner Michael Phelps and a great white shark that turned out to be computer generated, but based on actual speeds of such animals, and Phelps wearing illegal swim gear.

Programming information

Home media

See also
 Air Jaws
 Ocean of Fear
 Blood in the Water
 Megalodon: The Monster Shark Lives
 Sharkrunners

References

General references

Inline citations

External links
 Shark Week on the Discovery Channel website
 Shark Week at the Internet Movie Database
 It's time for Shark Week to redeem itself, Boston Globe
 Shark Week's ratings show there's blood in the water , Discover
 More proof a Megalodon did not swim with the Nazis, Arstechnica

Television programming blocks in the United States
Discovery Channel
American annual television specials
Sharks
Recurring events established in 1988
June events
July events
August events
Week-long events